Kathir is an Indian actor who appears in Tamil language films. He made his breakthrough by playing the lead role in Madha Yaanai Koottam (2013) and gained critical acclaim for his performance in Kirumi (2015), Vikram Vedha (2017), Pariyerum Perumal (2018) and Sigai (2019). In 2022, he starred in the Prime Video thriller series Suzhal: The Vortex.

Early life 
Kathir was born and brought up in Erode. He completed his basic education in Bharathi Vidya Bhavan and pursued Civil engineering in Kumaraguru College of Technology, Coimbatore. He married Sanjana on 4 March 2018.

Career 
Kathir made his debut as an actor through Vikram Sukumaran's Madha Yaanai Koottam (2013), which was produced by noted music composer G. V. Prakash Kumar Kathir acted in this movie during his college studies. In the evenings, after finishing college studies, he went to shootings. The film opened to positive reviews, with Kathir earning critical acclaim for his portrayal of a village youngster. A critic from The Hindu stated Kathir "tries to do his best", while Sify.com stated he had done "a good job in his first role". Kathir then won critical acclaim for his performance in the thriller film, Kirumi (2015) directed by Anucharan and written by Manikandan. The film was also sent to international film festivals, with a critic from The Hollywood Reporter noting that "playing his namesake character, Kathir makes for a particularly avid small-time crook, effortlessly cataloging useful information for the police officers he smoothly ingratiates himself with by dint of feigned respect and subtle manipulation".

In 2017, he was seen in the action thriller Ennodu Vilayadu alongside Bharath. He was also cast in Vikram Vedha with R. Madhavan and Vijay Sethupathi, Pa. Ranjith's production Pariyerum Perumal (2018), for which he attained national acclaim and was noted for his "outstanding performance". In 2019, Sigai, where he portrayed a gentle and dedicated performance of an effeminate man. He then released Sathru (2019), a crime thriller. He then performed in Bigil (2019), a sports movie directed by Atlee Kumar as a football coach. Looking fresh from his Bigil football overkill, Kathir takes lead in a film that mixes entertainment, sport and horror to a confused extent. His film Jada (2019) is made with hefty intentions, but does not live up-to the expectations.
His film Sarbath was released as a direct television premier which received positive reviews as a family entertainer.

As well as starring in follow-up movies, he had starred in an Amazon Prime Video series created by Pushkar-Gayathri hence "Suzhal: The Vortex". The series garnered a widespread pan-India response as well as favourable and positive reviews from the audience and critics alike.  The actor garnered a lot of attention for his acutely stylized acting skills as well as his choice of script selection as both a fresh and meticulous actor. 
He continued to move the audience with his screen presence through "Thalaikoothal" (2023) with a rural backdrop. It was a success due to its poignant drama and Kathir played a fresh role continuing to impress the audience with his script selection and acting sense.

Filmography 

Web series

Awards and nominations

References

External links
 

Living people
Tamil male actors
Male actors from Tamil Nadu
21st-century Indian male actors
Male actors in Tamil cinema
1992 births